To Mega Therion (meaning the great beast in Greek) is the debut album by Swiss extreme metal band Celtic Frost, released on 27 October 1985 by Noise Records. The cover artwork is a painting by H. R. Giger entitled Satan I. The album was a major influence on the then-developing death metal and black metal genres.

Reception

Ned Raggett in his review for AllMusic wrote, "The bombastic 'Innocence and Wrath' starts To Mega Therion off on just the appropriate note – Wagnerian horn lines, booming drums, and a slow crunch toward apocalypse. ... With that setting the tone, it's into the maddeningly wild and woolly Celtic Frost universe full bore, Warrior roaring out his vocals with glee and a wicked smile while never resorting to self-parodic castrato wails. 'The Usurper' alone is worth the price of admission, an awesome display of Warrior's knack around brute power and unexpectedly memorable riffs." According to Raggett, "other prime cuts" include "Circle of the Tyrants", "Dawn of Megiddo", "Tears in a Prophet's Dream", "Eternal Summer" and "Necromantical Screams". Raggett concludes his review by stating that the album "is and remains death metal at its finest". Canadian journalist Martin Popoff considers the album "a black metal landmark" and "the most consistent example of early death metal that exist". He remarks how "the band had decided to delve more unto the extreme" and praised Tom Warrior's "surprisingly accomplished" lyrics and the mix of death, black and doom metal with a pinch of ambient music.

Track listing 
All songs written by Tom G. Warrior, except where noted.

Personnel 
Celtic Frost
Tom G. Warrior – guitars, vocals, effects, co-producer, assistant engineer
Dominic Steiner – bass, bass effects
Reed St. Mark – drums, percussion, effects

Additional musicians
 Martin Ain – bass (tracks 2 and 3 on 1999 re-release; songs originally from Tragic Serenades EP)
 Wolf Bender – French horn (tracks 1, 4 and 10)
 Claudia-Maria Mokri – additional vocals (tracks 2, 6 and 10)
 Horst Müller, Urs Sprenger – sound effects (track 9)

Production
Horst Müller – producer, engineer, mixing
Rick Lights – assistant engineer
Karl Walterbach – executive producer

References

Further reading 

 Shapiro, Marc (1993). "The Birth of Death: A Speed Demonology". Guitar presents Speed Demons of Metal, 6–9, 23, 110–112.

Celtic Frost albums
1985 debut albums
Noise Records albums
Albums with cover art by H. R. Giger